She's Gotta Have It is a 1986 American black-and-white comedy-drama film written, produced, edited and directed by Spike Lee. Filmed on a small budget and Lee's first feature-length film to be released, it earned positive reviews and launched Lee's career.

The film stars Tracy Camilla Johns, Tommy Redmond Hicks, John Canada Terrell and Lee himself in a supporting role. Also appearing are cinematographer Ernest Dickerson as a Queens, New York, resident and, in an early appearance, S. Epatha Merkerson as a doctor. The plot concerns a young woman (Johns) who is seeing three men, and the feelings this arrangement provokes.

In 2017, Lee adapted the film into a Netflix series.

In 2019, the film was selected for preservation in the United States National Film Registry by the Library of Congress for being "culturally, historically, or aesthetically significant".

Plot
Nola Darling is a young, attractive graphic artist living in Brooklyn who juggles three suitors: the polite and well-meaning Jamie Overstreet; the self-obsessed model Greer Childs; and the immature, motor-mouthed bicycle messenger Mars Blackmon. Nola is attracted to the best in each of them, but refuses to commit to any of them, cherishing her personal freedom instead, while each man wants her for himself.

Her carefree, sexually liberated lifestyle ultimately comes to an end when her three male suitors meet and compare notes on Nola. While Greer justifies Nola's callous behavior by claiming that she sees the three not as individuals but as a collective, Jamie and Mars become bitter over how little Nola cares for all three men. Opal, a lesbian friend of Nola's who believes every person is capable of sexual fluidity, expresses attraction to her and when Nola asks how having sex with a woman is, offers her an opportunity to find out. However, Nola declines.

Realizing that Greer and Mars are too scared of losing Nola to force her to choose one of them, Jamie tells her that she must choose a single lover. Nola scoffs at this, and persuades him to come to her apartment several days later for casual sex. Jamie rapes her and mockingly asks her if he's as good sexually as Greer or Mars. Nola has an epiphany: realizing that her choices have turned Jamie against her, she decides to call his bluff. Nola dumps Greer and Mars and tells Jamie that she is ready for a monogamous relationship. Believing that her sexual activity has prevented her from committing to a single guy, Nola tells Jamie their relationship has to be celibate for the time being. After at first rejecting Nola's "no sex" decree, Jamie agrees to it.

Nola and Jamie's reunion, however, is followed by a coda which dismantles the "happy ending" of the couple coming together. In a monologue delivered to the camera, Nola reveals that her vow of celibacy and her decision to be with Jamie exclusively was "a moment of weakness". She says that she soon began to cheat on Jamie and their relationship collapsed. Nola proudly proclaims that monogamy is a form of slavery and that her lifestyle is freedom in its purest form. The film closes with a view of Nola going to bed alone.

Themes
Nola idealizes the freedom to have multiple sexual partners that men have typically enjoyed. "A woman (or, at least Nola) can be a sexual being, doesn’t have to belong to a man, and perhaps shouldn't even wish for such a thing." The narrative provided by Nola's narration has been described as the most revolutionary element in the film, a representation of the struggle African American women faced in society at the time.

Cast

Influence
She's Gotta Have It was Lee's first feature-length motion picture as a writer/director and is a landmark independent film of American cinema. He was initially inspired by viewing Akira Kurosawa's Rashomon in film school.

The New York Times wrote that the film
"ushered in (along with Jim Jarmusch's Stranger Than Paradise) the American independent film movement of the 1980s. It was also a groundbreaking film for African-American filmmakers and a welcome change in the representation of blacks in American cinema, depicting men and women of color not as pimps and whores, but as intelligent, upscale urbanites."

Production
Lee was inspired to do the film by conversations he had with male friends that boasted about how many female friends they had, which led him to want to make a movie about an "independent Black woman who is leading her life as a man as far as relationships go."; he made a questionnaire with personal sexual questions and asked women that he knew about their habits and formed the foundation of the film based on their answers.

Filming was completed in twelve days during the summer of 1985 on a budget of $175,000. The 12-shooting-days production began with $18,000 from the New York State Council on the Arts, a $10,000 grant from the Jerome Foundation, $500 from the Brooklyn Arts and Cultural Association, assists from Lee's family (a score from dad Bill, still photos from brother David, an acting turn from sister Joie, brothers Chad and Cinque acting as production assistants), and a cast working for deferred payments.

That wasn't enough to get the movie through post-production, so a rough cut screening happened at NYU. "I'm Spike Lee and I hope that you liked the film," Lee said afterwards. "I'll be calling you soon about becoming financially involved in helping us complete it." The final budget was $175,000, and the resulting release was profitable ($7.1 million domestically).

Impact
The film catalyzed the Fort Greene, Brooklyn neighborhood where it was shot. Lee portrayed the neighborhood as a vibrant cosmopolitan community where successful African Americans thrived, focusing not only on Nola and her struggles, but also on local children, residents, and graffiti. Fort Greene Park is the setting of much of the movie, and is portrayed as a comfortable place for the characters. People were encouraged to investigate the area's public spaces and viewers in other places investigated similar thriving public spaces of community importance.

Writer and director Quentin Tarantino, along with collaborators Roger Avary and Craig Hamann, consider the production and low budget nature of the film a major influence in making his unreleased first film My Best Friend’s Birthday and later Reservoir Dogs.

Following the film's release, media attention was drawn to Brooklyn, and to its artists and musicians.

Release

Box office
She's Gotta Have It opened in one theater on August 8, 1986, and earned $28,473 on its opening weekend. The film ultimately grossed $7,137,503 in the United States.

Critical response
The film was very well received by critics and audiences. Review aggregator website Rotten Tomatoes reports a 94% score based on 32 reviews, with an average rating of 7.1/10. The consensus states: "With She's Gotta Have It, Spike Lee delivered his bracing first shot across Hollywood's bow -- and set the template for the groundbreaking act to follow." It holds a 79/100 average on Metacritic.

The New York Times Film critic, D.J.R. Bruckner, wrote of the film in 1986, that it “stripped of some of the distractions of this presentation, their story has a touch of the classic. These people are not victims of blind forces; they make choices, defend them and grow in understanding, not always happily, as a result. Their story would be more enjoyable in a more polished film, but it has a power that is not dissipated by this one's weaknesses.”

John Simon of the National Review called She's Gotta Have It a "cutesy, trivial sex carrousel".

Home media
She's Gotta Have It was first released on VHS, initially by Key Video and later by PolyGram Video as part of a distribution deal with Chris Blackwell's Island World Group, which retained the rights following the purchase of Island Records by PolyGram (PolyGram would eventually acquire the rest of Island in December 1994).

In the mid-1990s, The Criterion Collection released the film on laserdisc. According to Lee's agent, the film was to be eventually released on DVD. Jonathan Turell of The Criterion Collection ended that rumor, saying "No for She's Gotta Have It. We don't have DVD rights." This laserdisc is the only release of the film that has the NC-17-rated director's cut, including sexual content that was cut to obtain an R rating. This release also contains an exclusive commentary by Spike Lee.

The film’s first North American DVD release was in January 2008 by 20th Century Fox Home Entertainment through United Artists and Metro-Goldwyn-Mayer. Despite its availability on DVD in the United Kingdom, the DVD release for Region 1 took longer than expected.

In 2010, the film was digitized in High Definition (1080i) and broadcast on MGM HD.

Awards and honors
1986 Cannes Film Festival
 Award of the Youth, Foreign Film – Spike Lee (won)

1986 Los Angeles Film Critics Awards
 New Generation Award – Spike Lee (won)

1987 Independent Spirit Awards
 Best First Feature – Spike Lee (won)
 Best Female Lead – Tracy Camilla Johns (nominated)

In 2019, the film was selected by the Library of Congress for preservation in the National Film Registry for being "culturally, historically, or aesthetically significant".

TV series

On September 15, 2016, Netflix announced a deal to produce a series based on the film, with Lee returning to direct the first season and serve as executive producer. Ten 30-minute episodes were ordered. Netflix released the series in November 2017. On July 17, 2019, Netflix canceled the series after two seasons.

Reflection
In 2014, Lee said that his one regret as a filmmaker was the rape scene in She's Gotta Have It:
"If I was able to have any do-overs, that would be it. It was just totally ... stupid. I was immature. It made light of rape, and that’s the one thing I would take back. I was immature and I hate that I did not view rape as the vile act that it is. I can promise you, there will be nothing like that in She's Gotta Have It, the TV show [that will air on Netflix], that's for sure."

References

External links
 
 
 
 
 Reelblack TV interview with John Canada Terrell

1986 films
1986 directorial debut films
1986 comedy-drama films
1986 LGBT-related films
1986 romantic comedy films
1986 romantic drama films
1980s English-language films
1980s romantic comedy-drama films
African-American comedy-drama films
African-American gender relations in popular culture
African-American LGBT-related films
African-American romance films
American black-and-white films
American independent films
American romantic comedy-drama films
Films adapted into television shows
Films directed by Spike Lee
Films partially in color
Films set in Brooklyn
Films shot in New York (state)
Films with screenplays by Spike Lee
1986 independent films
Lesbian-related films
LGBT-related romantic comedy-drama films
United States National Film Registry films
40 Acres and a Mule Filmworks films
1980s American films